Buffalo Smelting Works is a historic copper smelting complex located in the Black Rock neighborhood of Buffalo in Erie County, New York. It was built in 1891, and consists of a twinned, 2 1/2-story, brick building.  It is topped by pitched roofs and clerestories.  The industrial building reflects Romanesque Revival design.  The building is the only element left from the smelting complex originally built by the Calumet and Hecla Mining Company.  The property was acquired by the American Radiator Company in 1920, and is now part of a marina.

It was listed on the National Register of Historic Places in 2011.

References

External links
Buffalo as an Architectural Museum: Buffalo Smelting Work

Industrial buildings and structures on the National Register of Historic Places in New York (state)
Romanesque Revival architecture in New York (state)
Infrastructure completed in 1891
Buildings and structures in Buffalo, New York
Copper smelters
1891 establishments in New York (state)
National Register of Historic Places in Buffalo, New York
Calumet and Hecla Mining Company
Metal companies of the United States